The Petersen and Fritz dragster, also known as the Can-Am dragster, is a streamliner dragster.

Purchased by Herman Petersen in 1974, it was built on a Woody chassis with a blue-anodized aluminum body, which strongly resembled a contemporary Can-Am car.

It was powered by a Donovan  Chrysler hemi (when most of the competition was running  hemis). This, plus the  weight disadvantage thanks to the full body, meant it was only capable of mid-6 second e.t.s, when conventional fuellers were running low sixes. 

The car ran a total of just nineteen times before being retired.  It was restored by Petersen in the 1980s, and now resides in the Don Garlits Museum of Drag Racing in Ocala, Florida.

Notes

Sources
 Taylor, Thom.  "Beauty Beyond the Twilight Zone" in Hot Rod, April 2017, pp. 30–43.

1970s cars
Drag racing cars

Rear-wheel-drive vehicles